Tibouchina bipenicillata is a species of flowering plant in the family Melastomataceae, native to Colombia, Costa Rica, Panama and Venezuela. The type specimen is kept in the herbarium at Conservatoire et Jardin botaniques de la Ville de Genève in Switzerland.

References

bipenicillata
Flora of Colombia
Flora of Costa Rica
Flora of Panama
Flora of Venezuela
Plants described in 1850